The Nimrod Theatre Company, commonly known as The Nimrod, was an Australian theatre company based in Sydney.  It was founded by in 1970 by Australian actor John Bell, Richard Wherrett and Ken Horler, and gained a reputation for producing more "good new Australian drama" from 1970 to 1985 than any other Australian theatre company.

The company's original theatre located in Nimrod Street, Kings Cross is now home to Griffin Theatre Company.  The company moved in 1974 to Belvoir Street, Surry Hills, but retained its original name. From 1981 to 1988 it also played in the Seymour Centre theatres. The company ceased operations in 1988.

Subsequently, the Surry Hills venue became known as the Belvoir St Theatre. The history of the company was documented by Julian Meyrick in a book adapted from his PhD thesis.

References
 
 
 
 

Theatre companies in Australia
Theatre in Sydney
1970 establishments in Australia
1985 disestablishments in Australia
Australian companies established in 1970